Nutaarmiut Island (old spelling: Nutârmiut) is an island in Avannaata municipality in northwestern Greenland.

Geography 
Nutaarmiut Island is located in Tasiusaq Bay, in the north-central part of Upernavik Archipelago. It is separated from Mattaangassut Island in the northwest by a narrow Ikerasakassak strait, and from Qallunaat Island in the north by the waterways of Tasiusaq Bay.

Settlement 
The island is home to Nutaarmiut, the smallest village in the archipelago, perched on the eastern shore of the island.

References 

Tasiusaq Bay
Islands of the Upernavik Archipelago